Faith, Hope and Charity or Faith, Hope and Love may refer to:
 The three theological virtues of faith, hope, and charity (or love)
 Saints Faith, Hope and Charity, 2nd-century Christian martyrs and daughters of Saint Sophia
 Faith Hope and Charity (US band), a 1970s disco act
 Faith Hope & Charity (British band), a 1990s British group
 Faith, Hope and Charity, nickname for the three Gloster Gladiator fighter planes flown by Hal Far Fighter Flight RAF during the Siege of Malta in 1940
 Faith, Hope and Charity, three of the fighters flown by No. 1435 Flight RAF in the Falkland Islands
 Faith Hope Love, 1990 rock album by King's X.
 Faith Hope Love (EP), a 2019 EP by Stan Walker
 Faith + Hope + Love, 2009 Christian album by Hillsong Church
 Fé, Esperanza y Caridad, 1974 Mexican film

See also
 Original names for the Three Sisters (Oregon), volcanic peaks in Oregon, USA
 Love Hope Faith 2017 country rap album by Colt Ford
 Love Is the Answer: 24 Songs of Faith, Hope and Love, 2004 gospel album by Glen Campbell
 Faith, Hope y Amor, 2013 Latin pop album by Frankie J
 Hope & Faith, US television sitcom first broadcast 2003–2006
 Faith (disambiguation)
 Hope (disambiguation)
 Charity (disambiguation)
 Love (disambiguation)